Dharhara is a village in the Bhagalpur district of Bihar, India. There is a tradition of plantation when a girl is born in any family of this village. The occupation of this village is farming.

Geography 
Dharhara is located at 25°21'49.6"N 87°08'07.3"E. Most of the villagers are farmers by profession. It is contiguous with Gosain Village to its East, GopalPur to its South, panchgachia to its North and Naugachhia Block to its West. Its assembly constituency is Gopalpur assembly constituency and Lok Sabha Constituency is Bhagalpur parliamentary constituency. Its nearest small city is Naugachia and bigger city is Bhagalpur. Most villagers speaks in Angika, Hindi, and Urdu language.

Tree plantations 
The village came into the limelight in 2010, when it was reported that the families plant a minimum of 10 trees whenever a girl child is born. The tree-planting had been going on for generations. By 2010, the village with a population of 7,000, had over 100,000 trees, mostly  mango and lychee. In India, female infanticide and dowry deaths have been a big for challenge the authorities; therefore, this initiative of Dharhara's residents was hailed by the Bihar's chief minister, Nitish Kumar. In 2010, the village was also in the news for illegal banks floated by criminals.

References 

Villages in Bhagalpur district